Horus Temple is a 6,150 ft elevation summit located in the Grand Canyon, in Coconino County of Arizona, Southwestern United States. This butte is situated as the central landform in a 3-series line of peaks southwest of the Shiva Temple (forested)-tableland prominence.

Geology
The top of Horus Temple is a flat ~north-south platform composed of the reddish Pennsylvanian-Permian Supai Group. The 69th unit and uppermost unit of the Supai Group is the extremely resistant Esplanade Sandstone. At the north end of this platform is the butte’s prominence, an extremely fractured remnant, of cliff-former Coconino Sandstone capstone, upon a small slope of slope-forming, deep brown-red Hermit Formation.

The Supai Group sits on the resistant cliff-forming, typically massive Redwall Limestone, (as in the connected Tower of Set southwards). The base of the Redwall has a short, but resistant cliff of (3rd-unit) Muav Limestone. Below the Muav are units 2 and 1 of the 3-unit Tonto Group, the colorful dull-greenish Bright Angel Shale, and dp-brown Tapeats Sandstone.

Gallery

References

Colorado Plateau
Grand Canyon
Grand Canyon National Park
Landforms of Coconino County, Arizona
Mountains of Arizona
Mountains of Coconino County, Arizona